Oleg Zurabiani (born 15 May 1957) is a Georgian judoka. He competed in the men's lightweight event at the 1976 Summer Olympics, representing the Soviet Union.

References

1957 births
Living people
Male judoka from Georgia (country)
Olympic judoka of the Soviet Union
Judoka at the 1976 Summer Olympics